The Knarrarós Lighthouse is located on the south coast of Iceland.

Description

The square, two-staged light tower was built in 1938–1939 and was Iceland's first lighthouse built of reinforced concrete. The lighthouse was designed by Axel Sveinsson, and influenced by the ideas of Guðjón Samúelsson (1887–1950), state architect of Iceland.

There are black panels arrayed vertically between the windows that create the appearance that the tower has a black vertical stripe on each side. The design is a blend of the functionalism and art nouveau styles. The light characteristic is one three-second-long flash every thirty seconds.

The site is open to visitors but the tower is closed.

See also

List of lighthouses in Iceland

References

External links

Lighthouses completed in 1939
Lighthouses in Iceland
Southern Region (Iceland)